The Scots Language Centre is an organisation that promotes the use of the Scots language. The current director of the Scots Language Centre is Dr Michael Dempster. It receives funding from the Scottish Government.

History
The organisation was founded in 1993 as the Scots Language Resource Centre. In 1996, the centre held a "Spellin Collogue" in an attempt to reform Scots orthography, but was ultimately unsuccessful.

In preparation for a new question on the census asking whether residents could understand Scots, the organisation launched a website with example of the language to allow respondents to determine if they could.

A digital map of Scotland with Scots place names was published by the Centre in 2019. During 2020, the Centre researched Scots exonyms for European settlements and countries and compiled a map based on this information the following year. In November 2021, the Centre produced a Scots dialectal map of Scotland. In September 2021, the Centre published a guide for writing in Scots.

References

External links
 

Scots language
Language regulators